Christo van der Merwe (born 5 January 1995) is a Namibian rugby union player for the  in the Currie Cup and the Rugby Challenge. His regular position is flanker.

Rugby career

Van der Merwe was born in Windhoek.

References

External links
 

1995 births
Living people
Namibia international rugby union players
Namibian rugby union players
Rugby union flankers
Rugby union players from Windhoek